Cold Lake Provincial Park is a provincial park in northeastern Alberta, Canada.

The park protects the boreal forest in a number of designated areas on the southern and northern shores of Cold Lake, one of the largest lakes in Alberta. These shores are important nesting grounds for waterfowl.

The forest contains poplar, birch, spruce, and other types of wood.

The protected area is continued into Saskatchewan with the Meadow Lake Provincial Park.

Activities
Recreational facilities are located in the park including campground and day use areas. Camping, canoeing, fishing (and ice fishing), sailing, power boating and other water sports are popular activities. 11.5 km of trails are maintained in the park, and are used for hiking, mountain biking, cross-country skiing and show walking.

Sport fishing is allowed in Cold Lake (brook stickleback, burbot, emerald shiner, fathead minnow, finescale dace, Iowa darter, lake trout, lake whitefish, logperch, longnose sucker, ninespine stickleback, northern pike, northern redbelly dace, slimy sculpin, spoonhead sculpin, spottail shiner, tullibee (cisco), walleye, white sucker, yellow perch) and Medley River (brook stickleback, burbot, emerald shiner, fathead minnow, finescale dace, lake chub, logperch, longnose sucker, northern redbelly dace, northern pearl dace, rainbow trout, spoonhead sculpin, spottail shiner, white sucker).

See also
List of provincial parks in Alberta
List of Canadian provincial parks

References

External links

Municipal District of Bonnyville No. 87
Provincial parks of Alberta